"And I Love You So" is a popular song written by folk singer and guitarist Don McLean and released on his 1970 debut album, Tapestry. Its chorus features an unusual rhyming scheme for a popular song: A-B-B-A versus the usual A-B-C (or A)-B.

Perry Como recording
"And I Love You So" was a 1973 hit for singer Perry Como on his RCA Victor album of the same name, And I Love You So, reaching No. 29 on the Billboard Hot 100 chart. It would be the last of his many popular recordings, dating back to 1943, to reach the Top 40. It also spent one week at No. 1 on the easy listening chart. It reached No. 2 in South Africa and in Britain, the record reached No. 3 on the UK Singles Chart on RCA Records and remained on the chart for 35 weeks (the longest of his hits in the UK).
Como also recorded a Spanish version, titled Y te quiero así.

Chart performance

Other recordings

The song has been recorded by many other artists in the years since McLean's original version:
Bobby Goldsboro included his version on his album Come Back Home in 1971.
 Shirley Bassey recorded this song on her album And I Love You So in 1972.
Bobby Vinton included his version on his album, Ev'ry Day of My Life in 1972.
 The song was recorded by Elvis Presley at RCA studio C in Hollywood, California, on March 11, 1975. It was released on his album Today.  Presley used it in almost every live show until his death.
 Sergio Franchi covered this song on his 1976 DynaHouse album 20 Magnificent Songs.
 In 1999, Glen Campbell recorded the song on his album My Hits and Love Songs.
 In 2005, Rick Astley covered the song on his 6th studio album Portrait.
In 2008, Harry Connick, Jr. included the song on his, Your Songs album.
 In 1993, George Lam recorded the song on his album When a Man Loves a Woman.
 Roch Voisine covered the song on his album Americana, in 2008.
 Claude François performed a French version, "Et je t'aime tellement", in 1977.
Other performers who have recorded the song include:Harry Belafonte, Tom T. Hall, Emmylou Harris, Engelbert Humperdinck, Howard Keel, Johnny Mathis, Nana Mouskouri, Olivia Newton-John, Jim Nabors, and Helen Reddy.

Popular culture
 A Filipino film starring Bea Alonzo, Sam Milby, and Derek Ramsay with the same name used the song on its official soundtrack.

See also
List of number-one adult contemporary singles of 1973 (U.S.)

References

1970 songs
1973 singles
Don McLean songs
Perry Como songs
Elvis Presley songs
Glen Campbell songs
Songs written by Don McLean